Satham Podathey is a 2007 Tamil-language psychological thriller film written and directed by Vasanth and produced by Shankar and Senthilnathan. It stars Prithviraj, Padmapriya and Nithin Sathya whilst Nassar, Suhasini, Premji and Raaghav play cameo roles. The film, which is based on a true incident, has music scored by Yuvan Shankar Raja, which received rave reviews. The film was released on 14 September 2007 to positive reviews.

Plot
The story revolves around Bhanumathy who marries Rathnavel Kalidas, a man who works in railways as a hockey player. He married Bhanu by hiding the facts that he is impotent and a recovering alcoholic. Soon, the relationship turns sour when the couple realizes that Rathnavel is impotent after a gynecologist tells them so. In spite of family pressures to get a mutual divorce, the old-fashioned Bhanu decides to go ahead with the marriage by adopting a child. With the baby's arrival, Rathnavel unfortunately becomes more insecure and tells Bhanu that the child reminds him about his weakness. Unfortunately, all hell breaks loose when Bhanu realizes that her husband was an alcoholic who knew about his impotency and had betrayed her. Rathnavel, in his anger, beats up Bhanu until she is almost unconscious. A few days later, she files for a divorce and stays with her parents for some days. Bhanu later meets Ravichandran, a happy-go-lucky guy who is a friend of her brother. Ravi proposes to Bhanu, and they later get married, but Rathnavel, who had vowed to make life miserable for Bhanu, returns. He kidnaps Bhanu and places a cadaver in her home before faking an accident with a cooking gas cylinder, leading Ravi and his family to believe that Bhanu died in a kitchen accident. After that, Rathnavel brings Bhanu to his bungalow in an isolated area and locks her in a soundproof room. When Ravi goes to Rathnavel's house to get some life insurance papers, a series of clues lead him to find Bhanu. After distracting Rathnavel, Ravi calls the police and rescues Bhanu. Rathnavel is sent to a mental asylum, where he later hangs himself. This seems to be a true story which happened in Andhra Pradesh in the late 1990s, and Rathnavel's (name changed) family members are still there in Kakinada, but the movie ends with a happy note when we see that Ravi and Bhanu are still happily married and Bhanu is visibly pregnant.

Cast
 Prithviraj Sukumaran as Ravichandran, Bhanu's second husband
 Padmapriya Janakiraman as Bhanumathy Sridharan, Rathnavel's ex-wife and Ravichandran's wife
 Nithin Sathya as Impotent Rathnavel, Bhanu's first husband
 Raaghav as Bhanu's brother
 Nassar as Vincent Selvakumar
 Suhasini as Gynecologist
 Sriman as Police
 Premji as Ravichandran's friend
 Jagan as Jegan, Rathnavel's friend
 Crane Manohar as Ramachandran
 Soundarya as Ramachandran's mother
 M. Krishnamoorthy (Nagesh Krishnamoorthy) as Bhanu's father

Soundtrack

Director Vasanth teamed up with composer Yuvan Shankar Raja again for the musical score after creating Poovellam Kettuppar (1999). The soundtrack, of Satham Podathey, featuring 5 tracks overall, was released on 14 June 2007 at the Kamarajar Arangam. A live concert was conducted by Yuvan Shankar Raja, playing all the songs on stage, whereas the five songs were released by five music directors each.

Reception

The music got positive reviews, praising Yuvan Shankar Raja's work. He was, in particular, lauded for making singers Shankar Mahadevan, Shreya Ghoshal and Sudha Raghunathan render songs in different genres as they earlier never did, whereas especially Raghunathan's first-time rendition of a Hip hop song called "Kadhal Periyadha", was seen as a "surprise item", cited as "bringing out the Britney Spears in her". Moreover, the album itself was described as a "pure musical delight", whilst composer Yuvan Shankar himself was cited to be rocking. "Pesugiren Pesugiren" and "O Indha Kaadhal" were topping the charts for some time. Neha Bhasin was later awarded the Reliance Mobile Vijay TV Award for Best Female Playback Singer for the song "Pesugiren Pesugiren"

References

External links
 

2007 films
2007 thriller films
2000s Tamil-language films
Indian psychological thriller films
Films directed by Vasanth
Films scored by Yuvan Shankar Raja